A Collection... is a compilation album by The Birthday Party. It contains tracks from the albums The Birthday Party, Prayers on Fire, Junkyard, and EPs and singles from that time period.

Track listing
Source: Discogs

References

1982 albums
The Birthday Party (band) albums

pl:Junkyard